Amar Janta Intermediate College , popularly known as Amar Janta College or as Amar Janta Inter College is an education institute in Katra Gulab Singh, Pratapgarh, Uttar Pradesh, India.

Gallery

See also
 Baba Sarvjeet Giri Memorial College

References

External links
Amar Janta Inter College on Facebook

Intermediate colleges in Uttar Pradesh
Buildings and structures in Pratapgarh district, Uttar Pradesh
Educational institutions in India with year of establishment missing